John Sullivan Mayo (born February 26, 1930) is an American engineer, AT&T executive and seventh president of Bell Labs, known from contributions to the computer and telecommunications industry.

In 1979, Mayo was elected a member of the National Academy of Engineering for contributions and leadership in the realization of digital facilities for the telecommunications network.

Biography 
Born in Greenville, North Carolina, he earned B.S., M.S. and Ph.D. degrees in electrical engineering from North Carolina State University.

Following this, Mayo joined Bell Labs, now Nokia Bell Labs, (1955) where he first worked on early computers as the TRADIC and Leprechaun, the Telstar satellite, ocean sonar systems and various switching systems. He was elected vice president at Bell Labs (1975) and eventually became the seventh president (1991) until his retirement (1995). He is credited with globalizing Bell Labs and forging closer ties between its research and development and business units.

Awards
IEEE Fellow (1967).
Outstanding Engineering Alumnus of North Carolina State University (1977).
With Eric E. Sumner and M. Robert Aaron he won  the IEEE Alexander Graham Bell Medal (1978) and the Computer and Communications Society Koji Kobayashi Award (1988) for the pioneer work on T-1.
Elected to the National Academy of Engineering (1979).
National Medal of Technology award (1990) for providing the technological foundation for information age communications and for overseeing the conversion of the national switched telephone network from analog to digital-based technology.
The Industrial Research Institute (IRI) Medal (1992).
Engineering Manager of the Year by the American Society for Engineering Management (1992).
American Association of Engineering Societies (AAES) Chair's Award (2010).

References

External links 
 John S. Mayo Distinguished Engineering Alumnus Award Recipient — 1977

1930 births
Living people
21st-century American engineers
North Carolina State University alumni
Scientists at Bell Labs
Fellow Members of the IEEE
Members of the United States National Academy of Engineering
National Medal of Technology recipients
People from Greenville, North Carolina